One Came Home is a children's historical novel set in Wisconsin during 1871. It was written by Amy Timberlake and published by Knopf in 2013. One Came Home is a winner of the Edgar Award for Best Juvenile Mystery and a Newbery Honor award in 2014. This book was published by Random House Children's Books on January 7, 2014. Along with the Edgar Award and a Newbery Honor, One Came Home, was named best book of the year by the Washington Post, Kirkus Reviews, Bookpage, Bank Street, and National Public Radio. It was also a part of the Scholastic Book Club selection.

Plot summary
Georgie Burkhardt is a plain-speaking, gun-toting girl in 1871 Wisconsin. She is convinced that her older sister, whom everyone in town believes is dead, is still alive and sets off to the western frontier to find her.

Reception
A reviewer for Common Sense Media hailed the protagonist's voice as “distinctive and likable”, but also warned that the “slow pace might deter some readers”.

Awards
One Came Home received the following accolades:
2015 Pennsylvania Young Readers' Choice Award Nominee for Grades 6-8
2014 Judy Lopez Memorial Award for Children's Literature Nominee
2014 Society of Midland Authors Award for Children's Fiction
2014 John Newbery Medal Honor Book
2014 Edgar Award for Best Juvenile Mystery

References

External links
Newbery Honors
Edgar Awards

2013 American novels
2013 children's books
American young adult novels
Children's historical novels
Newbery Honor-winning works
Edgar Award-winning works
Novels set in the historical United States
Fiction set in 1871
Novels set in Wisconsin
Alfred A. Knopf books